Vampirates: Tide of Terror, is a 2006 children's novel by British author Justin Somper. It is the sequel to Demons of the Ocean and the second in the Vampirates series.

Synopsis
The adventures of twins Grace and Connor Tempest continue in the second Vampirates novel, Tide of Terror.

Connor may only be fourteen, but he has taken to the life of a pirate like a duck to water. However, his loyalties are divided between his shipmates and his sister.
Meanwhile, Grace is not finding pirate life so appealing. She cannot shake the feeling that all is not well on the Vampirate ship she has left behind. Dare she try to return to it?

New experiences await them both, including a journey to the fabled Pirate Academy.

Characters
 Connor Tempest – Fourteen-year-old pirate protégé who loves the pirate life; twin brother of Grace Tempest.
 Grace Tempest – Fourteen-year-old who cares deeply for the Vampirates; twin sister of Connor Tempest.
 Lorcan Furey – Midshipman – Rescues Grace in the first book of the series after seeing her struggling for life; they are in love.
 Vampirate Captain – Mysterious captain of the Vampirate ship, whose authority has been questioned by his crew.
 Darcy Flotsam – Figurehead of the Vampirate ship by day and vampire by night; Grace's friend.
 Sidorio – Vampire who resisted the authority of the Vampirate Captain, resulting in his banishment.
 Cheng Li – Former deputy of the Diablo and current teacher at the Pirate Academy
 Captain Molucco Wrathe – Captain of the Diablo
 Matilda "Ma" Kettle – Owner of Ma Kettle's Tavern
 Shanti - Lorcan Furey's human donor
 Bartholomew "Bart" Pearce – Fellow pirate aboard the Diablo and Connor's best friend
 Cutlass Cate – Becomes deputy of the Diablo once Cheng Li leaves; known for swordsmanship and skill.
 Sugar Pie – Waitress at Ma Kettle's Tavern; sings at parties
 Jez Stukeley – Used to be a pirate aboard the Diablo, another good friend of Connor; he is now a Vampirate. His "master" is Sidorio.
 Commodore Kuo – Headmaster of the Pirate Academy
 Jacoby Blunt – Student at Pirate Academy, becomes good friends with Connor but betrays him in the Lagoon of Doom (Pirate Academy)
 Jasmine Peacock – Student at Pirate Academy, a good friend to Jacoby and Connor

2006 British novels
Vampire novels
Novels about pirates
British young adult novels
Simon & Schuster books

pl:Wampiraci: Fala terroru